The USSF Division 2 Professional League (D2 Pro League) was a temporary professional soccer league created by the United States Soccer Federation (USSF) for the 2010 season. The twelve-team league was formed as a compromise between the feuding United Soccer Leagues (USL) and the North American Soccer League (NASL). The D2 Pro League was the second tier of the United States soccer league system below Major League Soccer. The league also included two clubs from Canada and one club from Puerto Rico.

History

On August 27, 2009, Nike agreed to sell their stake in the United Soccer Leagues to investment company NuRock, instead of Jeff Cooper, who had aligned with a group of USL First Division team owners. Disappointed with the sale and state of the league, the ownership group broke away after the 2009 season with the intent to form a new incarnation of the North American Soccer League. The leagues sued each other, but ultimately withdrew their lawsuits and agreed to mediate with the United States Soccer Federation.

The USSF found that three of the NASL teams (NSC Minnesota Stars, Rochester Rhinos, and FC Tampa Bay) had binding contracts to play in the USL First Division in 2010, leaving the NASL with too few teams to be sanctioned. However, this left the USL First Division with only six teams, also too few for sanctioning. The USSF stripped the USL First Division of its sanctioning, and denied sanctioning to the NASL. After a week of negotiations among the three, the USSF agreed to run a 12-team interim league for 2010. The six extant teams in each league would each occupy their own conference, but teams belonging to both leagues would play each other.

Teams

Competition format

Pods
It was announced that the season would be centered around what are called pods. The pods are constructed around geographic regions and do not follow conference lines. Teams within the same pod played each other four times, twice at home and twice away. Teams played one team outside of their pod four times, twice at home and twice away, and played the rest of the teams outside their pod twice, once at home and once away. This resulted in a thirty-game season for each team, and had the additional advantage of reducing travel costs. The season ended a playoff format to crown a league champion.

Playoff format
At the end of the regular season, the top teams in each conference qualified for the playoffs as the top two seeds.  In addition, the remaining six teams with the highest point totals, regardless of conference, also advanced to the playoffs.

Each round of the playoffs was a two-game aggregate goal series (the away goals rule was not applied as a tie-breaker). In the event that the aggregate score is tied after the second game of the series, the teams played two 15-minutes periods of extra time. If the score is still tied after extra time, the series was to be decided by a penalty shootout.

2010 season

NASL Conference standings

USL Conference standings

Playoff standings

Match results

Final regular season results. Based on the results at the NASL results table and USL schedule table

Playoffs
Each round was a two-game aggregate goal series. Home teams for the first game of each series listed at the bottom of the bracket.

Quarterfinals

Semifinals

Finals

Statistical leaders

Top scorers

Top assists 

|}

Individual awards
Most Valuable Player: Ryan Pore (Portland Timbers)
Defender of the Year: Greg Janicki (Vancouver Whitecaps)
Goalkeeper of the Year: Jay Nolly (Vancouver Whitecaps)
Rookie of the Year: Maxwell Griffin (Austin Aztex)
Coach of the Year: Bob Lilley (Rochester Rhinos)

Best XI
GK: Jay Nolly (Vancouver Whitecaps)
DF: Greg Janicki (Vancouver Whitecaps)
DF: Aaron Pitchkolan (Rochester Rhinos)
DF: Troy Roberts (Rochester Rhinos)
MF: Ryan Pore (Portland Timbers)
MF: Martin Nash (Vancouver Whitecaps)
MF: Jamie Watson (Austin Aztex)
MF: Paulo Araujo Jr. (Miami FC)
MF: Daniel Paladini (Carolina RailHawks)
FW: Eddie Johnson (Austin Aztex)
FW: Ali Gerba (Montreal Impact)

References

 
United States Soccer Federation
Defunct soccer leagues in the United States
Defunct soccer leagues in Canada
2